Baby Snakes is a film which includes footage from Frank Zappa's 1977 Halloween concert at New York City's Palladium Theater, backstage antics from the crew, and stop motion clay animation from award-winning animator Bruce Bickford.

Release 

Initially, the film had particular difficulty finding a distributor. Zappa tried to interest United Artists, the company that released 200 Motels, but they declined. Other studios followed United Artists' lead, fearing that Zappa's "cinematic style" had lost considerable appeal in 1970s pop culture, and also declined to distribute the film.

Several European distributors told Zappa that there might be interest if the running time was cut from its original 168-minute length. The film was cut to 90 minutes, but still, there were no takers.

Even after Bruce Bickford's sequences won first prize at a French animated film competition, there was no interest. Eventually Zappa took it upon himself to distribute the film independently, via his own production company, Intercontinental Absurdities. 

Baby Snakes premiered on Zappa's 39th birthday, December 21, 1979, at the Victoria Theater in Manhattan. During this initial New York run it was shown 24 hours a day. (The theater marquee can be seen in the opening credits to the 1980 Italian horror film, Eaten Alive!, partly filmed in New York at the time that Baby Snakes was playing.)

The film was first released on videocassette in 1983 in two forms. The complete edition was priced at $200 and was aimed at rental stores. A 90-minute edited version was available to the general public at a more reasonable "sell-through" price of $59.98. Both editions sold out quickly. 

After many years of being "out of print" Baby Snakes was released on DVD on December 9, 2003, by Eagle Vision United States in its complete unedited form. This version has a four channel Surround sound mix included. The surround mix was created by Zappa for theatrical showings in 1979 but not previously available on home video. This DVD was also the first time that the film was widely distributed to the public, rather than directly from Zappa.

Soundtrack 

The soundtrack album was first released on vinyl in 1983 as a picture disc, and subsequently on compact disc with different artwork. An expanded iTunes edition entitled Baby Snakes: The Compleat Soundtrack was released on December 21, 2012.

Reception 
The New York Times called it "a shapeless, inexcusably long concert film made of, by and about Frank Zappa"

See also 
 List of American films of 1979

References

External links
 
 

1979 films
1970s musical films
American films with live action and animation
American rock music films
Clay animation films
Concert films
Films directed by Frank Zappa
Films scored by Frank Zappa
Films set in 1977
Films shot in New York City
Films using stop-motion animation
1970s stop-motion animated films
1970s English-language films
1970s American films